The Heath-Henderson B-4 engine was a motorcycle piston engine modified for use in aircraft.

"The Heath Airplane Company's Model B-4 was an in-line, four-cylinder, air-cooled Henderson motorcycle engine converted for use in aircraft by modifying the lubrication system and the valves. The B-4 mainly powered the small and economical Heath Parasol monoplane, which Heath sold in kit form for homebuilders in the 1920s and '30s."

"The low-cost, reliable Henderson motorcycle engine was well-suited for the Heath airplane design because it helped make sport flying affordable for many people. Service was simple and economical because parts were cheap and easy to obtain throughout the country."

 A Heath-Henderson engine was featured on an episode of the television show American Pickers, first airing on December 12, 2011 in the U.S. A brief history of both the Henderson motocycle company and use of the engine in Heath aircraft was discussed.

Variants
Church Marathon J-3
The Marathon J-3 was a modification of the Heath-Henderson B-4 engine, used for light aircraft in the 1930s, by the Church Airplane and Mfg. Co, primarily for the Church Midwing JC-1. The Marathon J-3 cost $350 in 1932.

Applications
 Church Midwing JC-1
 Doromy Bath Tub
 Heath Parasol

Engines on display
 There is a B-4 on display at the New England Air Museum, Bradley International Airport, Windsor Locks, CT.

Specifications

Notes

References
This article contains material that originally came from the placard at the Steven F. Udvar-Hazy Center.

External links

1930s aircraft piston engines